Abo So (Papiamento for "Only You") is a 2013 musical romance film written and directed by Juan Francisco Pardo; set in Aruba, it is in the Papiamento language. It features the music of Padú del Caribe.

Production

The filming was performed over a period of 10 days. The cast worked for free.

Synopsis
A love story between Tatiana, a Aruban Mestiza woman, and Santiago, a Latino man.

Release
Abo So was premiered in Aruba in July 2013. At the Aruba International Film Festival, it won the People’s Choice Award of the Caribbean Spotlight Series.

Abo So was screened at the 2013 Trinidad and Tobago Film Festival.

It was shown at the Bahamas International Film Festival in December 2014, where it won Best Narrative Feature.

References

External links
 

Official site (Google cached version)

2013 drama films
2010s romantic musical films
Films set in Aruba
Papiamento-language films
Films shot in Aruba